The Fleet Problems are a series of naval exercises of the United States Navy conducted in the interwar period, and later resurrected by Pacific Fleet around 2014. 

The first twenty-one Fleet Problems — labeled with roman numerals as Fleet Problem I through Fleet Problem XXI —  were conducted between 1923 and 1940. They were usually once-a-year exercises in which U.S. naval forces would engage in mock battles. One or more of the forces would play the part of a European or Asian navy. They were the culmination of the Navy's annual training maneuvers.

Fleet Problem XXII, scheduled for 1941, was canceled because of the rising tensions with Japan that led to the US' entry into World War II. Following the outbreak of war, Fleet Problems underwent a prolonged hiatus, with other names being used to describe large American naval exercises. However, the term was revived in the 21st century under Admiral Scott H. Swift, with Fleet Problem XXIII through XXVIII taking place in the Pacific from 2014 on.

Interwar Fleet Problems

Fleet Problem I
Fleet Problem I was held in February and March of 1923, off the coast of Panama. 165 ships and nearly 40,000 men, sailing from both coasts of the United States, participated in the exercise. The newly formed US Battle Fleet, which constituted the attacking Black force, was tasked with attacking the Panama Canal. Shortly after the ships of the East Coast-based Scouting Fleet—which, playing the Blue Force, was tasked to defend the Panama Canal—transited the canal into the Pacific, Black Force launched a simulated air raid. Two battleships, USS New York (BB-34) and USS Oklahoma (BB-37) simulated aircraft carriers modeled after the under-construction USS Langley (CV-1). A single plane launched from Oklahoma—representing a 15-plane squadron—dropped 10 miniature bombs and theoretically "destroyed" the spillway of the Gatun Dam, ending the Fleet Problem. The exercise was widely regarded as a success, including by members of Congress and reporters who had observed the fleets in action, setting the stage for a repeated experimentation in future years.

Fleet Problems II, III, IV
Fleet Problems II, III, and IV all represented different phases of the same scenario, and took place within the same two months of 1924.

Fleet Problem II
Fleet Problem II, which ran from January 2nd to 15th, followed the movement of the Battle Fleet, designated as the "Blue Force", from its base on the West Coast to Panama. This was designed to simulate the first leg of an advance from Hawaii towards Asia, especially how well the ships could handle the long transoceanic voyage. During Fleet Problem II, the Navy refined at sea refueling techniques, including refueling side-by-side for the first time between the oiler Cuyama (AO-3) and three other ships.

Fleet Problem III and Grand Joint Army-Navy Exercise No. 2
During Fleet Problem III, the Scouting Force, designated the "Black Force," transited from its homeport in the Chesapeake Bay towards the Panama Canal from the Caribbean side. Once in the Caribbean, the naval forces involved in Fleet Problem III joined with the 15th Naval District and the Army's Panama Division in a larger joint exercise. The Blue force defended the canal from an attack from the Caribbean by the Black force, operating from an advance base in the Azores. This portion of the exercise also aimed to practice amphibious landing techniques and transiting a fleet rapidly through the Panama Canal from the Pacific side.

Black Fleet's intelligence officers simulated a number of sabotage operations during the course of Fleet Problem III. On January 14, Lieutenant Hamilton Bryan, Scouting Force's Intelligence Officer, personally landed in Panama with a small boat. Posing as a journalist, he entered the Panama Canal Zone. There, he "detonated" a series of simulated bombs in the Gatun Locks, control station, and fuel depot, along with simulating sabotaging power lines and communications cables throughout the 16th and 17th, before escaping to his fleet on a sailboat. 

On the 15th, one of Bryan's junior officers, Ensign Thomas Hederman, also snuck ashore to the Miraflores Locks. He learned the Blue Fleet's schedule of passage through the Canal from locals, and prepared to board USS California (BB-44), but turned back when he spotted classmates from the United States Naval Academy - who would have recognized and questioned him - on deck. Instead, he boarded USS New York (BB-34), the next ship in line, disguised as an enlisted sailor. After hiding overnight, he emerged early on the morning of the 17th, bluffed his way into the magazine of the No. 3 turret, and simulated blowing up a suicide bomb - just as the battleship was passing through the Culebra Cut, the narrowest portion of the Panama Canal. This "sank" New York, and blocked the Canal, leading the exercise arbiters to rule a defeat of the Blue Force and end that year's Grand Joint Army-Navy Exercise. Fleet Problem III was also the first which USS Langley (CV-1) took part in, replacing some of the simulated aircraft carriers used in Fleet Problem I.

Fleet Problem IV
The 1924 series culminated with Fleet Problem IV, running from January 23rd to February 1st. Designed to simulate offensive amphibious operations against Japan, the Blue Fleet was based in Panama -- simulating US forces based in the Philippines -- while the Black Fleet, made up of the Special Service Squadron, was tasked with defending Puerto Rico -- simulating Japanese defenders of Okinawa. Over the week of gameplay, Black aircraft attacked Blue forces consistently, but failed to prevent an amphibious landing - which allowed the US Marine Corps to test their new landing craft, Christie amphibious tanks, and combat logistics techniques. Fleet Problem IV met with serious criticism for having high levels of notional units - units that existed on paper, not in real life. Nearly 10% of Blue's ships and almost 70% of Black's forces were simulated. Vice Admiral Newton McCully argued that "In all exercises, constructive forces or features should be reduced to a minimum," and no later Fleet Problem used the same high level of simulated forces.

Fleet Problem V and Grand Joint Army-Navy Exercise No. 3 
Fleet Problem V ran from February 23rd to March 12th of 1925, forming the first third of a multi-month sequence of deployments that lasted until October. 

The Black force, the aggressor, was formed from the United States Battle Fleet, including the US' first aircraft carrier,  along with two seaplane tenders. The Blue force, formed out of the Scouting Force, enjoyed only about 30 floatplanes, half of which were fictional. Even these were limited, since the floatplanes aboard Blue forces' battleship  could not be launched for lack of a working catapult. The two fleets made only limited contact on March 10, when several Blue force submarines spotted and attacked the Black fleet, before being sunk by Blue escorts.

While returning to San Francisco and transiting to Hawaii, the fleet was followed closely by the Japanese tanker Hyatoma Maru, leading the fleet to tighten its communication security in an attempt to prevent espionage. 

One aspect of Fleet Problem V was conducted near Guadalupe Island off Baja California and involved attacking a lightly held position and refueling at sea.

Fleet Problem VI
Held off the west coast of Central America in early 1926.

Fleet Problem VII
This fleet problem was held March 1927 and involved defense of the Panama Canal. The highlight of the exercise was ’s successful air raid on the Panama Canal.

Fleet Problem VIII
Held in April 1928 between California and Hawaii and pitted Orange, a cruiser force from Pearl Harbor, versus Blue, the Battle Force. It also involved a convoy search and anti-submarine operations.

Fleet Problem IX
This scenario in January 1929 studied the effects of an attack upon the Panama Canal and conducted the operations necessary to carry out such an eventuality, and pitted the Battle Fleet (less submarines and Lexington) against a combination of forces including the Scouting Force (augmented by Lexington), the Control Forces, Train Squadron 1, and 15th Naval District and local army defense forces. These forces represented a significant commitment of the total US Navy: 72% of the fleet's battleships, 68% of the destroyers, and 52% of modern combat aircraft were involved in the scenario. In a daring move, Saratoga was detached from the fleet with only a single cruiser as escort to make a wide sweep to the south and "attack" the Panama Canal, which was defended by the Scouting Fleet and Saratogas sister ship, Lexington. She successfully launched her strike on 26 January and, despite being "sunk" three times later in the day, proved the versatility of a carrier-based fast task force.

Fleet Problem X
Held in 1930 in Caribbean waters. This time, however, Saratoga and Langley were "disabled" by a surprise attack from Lexington, showing how quickly air power could swing the balance in a naval action.

Fleet Problem XI
Held in April 1930 in the Caribbean.

Fleet Problem XII

Held in 1931 in waters west of Central America and Panama.
Black, attacking from the west, was to land forces and establish bases in Central America and destroy the Panama Canal, while Blue defended with an aviation-heavy fleet.

Blue's two carrier groups, centered on Saratoga and Lexington, attacked the invasion fleets but failed to stop the landings and got too close to the Black fleets.

Fleet Problem XIII
Fleet Problem XIII began in March 1932, one month after Army/Navy Grand Joint Exercise 4. Blue, based in Hawaii, was to sail east and invade three "enemy" ports on the North American Pacific coastline to try to gain a foothold for future operations. Blue had nine battleships, one aircraft carrier, and many lesser ships. Black defended with one modern aircraft carrier and some fictional battleships, as well as a number of actual cruisers, submarines, and many other ships.

Blue's advance was quickly located by Black's picket line of submarines which then took heavy losses from air attack. Both sides put a priority on destroying the enemy aircraft carrier, launching air attacks almost simultaneously after a few days of probing. Significant damage was laid on both carriers, with Blue's carrier eventually "sunk" by torpedo from a Black destroyer.

After-action critiques stressed the growing importance of naval aviation, and an increased need for the construction of aircraft carriers in the event of a war in the Pacific. Submarines operating at or near the surface were seen to be critically vulnerable to air observation and attack. The exercise showed that one carrier was insufficient for either fleet attack or area defense, so the practice of two or more carriers operating together became policy. Admiral Harry E. Yarnell said that six to eight carriers would be required for a Pacific campaign, but no orders were placed for new carriers, as Depression-era financial difficulties caused President Herbert Hoover to limit naval expenses.

Fleet Problem XIV
Held 10–17 February 1933, Fleet Problem XIV was the first naval exercise to test simulated aircraft carrier attacks against the west coast of the United States. Pacific cities had for decades vied for permanent stationing of U.S. military assets, and vulnerabilities exposed through the exercises were used by metropolitan navy boosters to leverage their cases. In spite of early Navy plans for San Francisco to be home port for the main west coast fleet, these plans had failed to materialize with San Diego incrementally gaining the majority of navy investments.

Fleet Problem XIV occurred the month before Franklin D. Roosevelt, a former Assistant Secretary of the Navy, took the office of the presidency. The results of the exercise between the U.S. Navy's Black and Blue fleets, were mixed. The simulated attacks had certainly been mitigated by the defensive Blue fleet, however the Black fleet had scored key victories with strikes on San Pedro and San Francisco, California.

Fleet Problem XV
Held in May 1934 in Hawaii, this was a three-phase exercise which encompassed an attack upon and defense of the Panama Canal, the capture of advanced bases, and a major fleet engagement.

Fleet Problem XVI
Held in May 1935 in the northern Pacific off the coast of Alaska and in waters surrounding the Hawaiian Islands, this operation was divided into five distinct phases, modeled on proposals for a US offensive in the Pacific. The largest of these interwar exercises, Fleet Problem XVI was seen as a provocation by Japan, which conducted its own major exercise in response.

Fleet Problem XVII
This problem took place off the west coast of the U.S., Central America, and the Panama Canal Zone in the spring of 1936. It was a five-phase exercise devoted to preparing the fleet for anti-submarine operations, testing communications systems, and training of aircraft patrol squadrons for extended fleet operations, and pitted the Battle Force against the submarine-augmented Scouting Force.

Fleet Problem XVIII
This exercise was held in May 1937 in Alaskan waters and in the vicinity of the Hawaiian Islands and Midway, practicing the tactics of seizing advanced base sites—a technique later to be polished to a high degree into close support and amphibious warfare doctrines.

Fleet Problem XIX

This operation in April and May 1938 gave the navy added experience in search tactics; in the use of submarines, destroyers, and aircraft in scouting and attack; in the dispositions of the fleet; and in the conduct of a major fleet battle. In addition, the exercise again dealt with the matter of seizing advanced fleet bases and defending them against minor opposition. Fleet Problem XIX also tested the capabilities of the Hawaiian Defense Force, augmenting it with fleet units to help to defend the islands against the United States Fleet as a whole. The last phase of the exercise exercised the fleet in operations against a defended coastline.

Fleet Problem XX
Took place in February 1939 in the Caribbean and Atlantic, and observed in person by President Franklin Roosevelt. The exercise simulated the defense of the East Coast of the United States and Latin America by the Black team from the invading White team. Participating in the maneuvers were 134 ships, 600 planes, and over 52,000 officers and men.

Fleet Problem XXI
Problem XXI was the first since Problem IX in 1928 that did not involve almost all of the active fleet. World War II had already begun in Europe, and the US Navy had been called upon to provide "Neutrality Patrols" in the Atlantic Ocean. Over 60 warships, including the aircraft carrier USS Ranger (CV-4), were engaged in these Atlantic patrols at the time of Fleet Problem XXI, which ran from April 1st to May 17th of 1940, shrinking the wargame.

Fleet Problem XXI was preceded in March with a mobilization exercise, where a simulated period of rising tension allowed the US Navy to practice distribution of secret orders, personnel recall, contingency planning, and other aspects of pre-war crisis. By April 3rd, the various participating fleet units had traveled to their starting positions, forming two teams: White, playing the US, operated out of Hawaii and Guam, while Black, playing Japan, operated out of major ports on the West Coast.

On May 7, just days after the conclusion of Fleet Problem XXI, the fleet received orders to stay in Hawaii as a deterrent against Japan's growing aggressiveness. This decision was controversial; Admiral James Richardson, who was Commander in Chief, United States Fleet, protested that the fleet would be left vulnerable to air attack, as evidenced by years of successful air attacks simulated in the Fleet Problems. After months of objection, Admiral Richardson was eventually dismissed. The fleet stayed in Hawaii throughout the rising crisis with Japan, where it was attacked by Japanese air forces on December 7th, 1941.

Fleet Problem XXII
There were four proposals for the Fleet Problem scheduled for 1941, with hypothetical exercise areas in the Marshall Islands, Panama, the coast of Mexico, and the Northeastern Pacific. By December 3rd, 1940, Chief of Naval Operations Admiral Harold Stark had cancelled the exercise based on the worsening global situation. In the eighteen years since Fleet Problem I, the series of exercises had become high-profile enough that the cancellation made the front page of the New York Times.

21st Century Fleet Problems

Fleet Problem XXIII 

Fleet Problem XXIII was the first to take place in the 21st century after the concept was revived by Admiral Scott Swift and the US Pacific Fleet. It centered around Carrier Strike Group One, led by the aircraft carrier USS Carl Vinson.

Fleet Problems XXIV–XXVIII 
Details on these Fleet Problems are not widely public, although the US Navy did publicize that one Fleet Problem in 2021 did include a large number of unmanned vehicles led from a Zumwalt-class destroyer.

Notes

References

Further reading
 Albert A. Nofi, To Train the Fleet For War: The U.S. Navy Fleet Problems, 1923–1940 (Newport, R.I.: Naval War College Press, 2010)
 Craig C. Felker, Testing American Sea Power: U.S. Navy Strategic Exercises, 1923–1940 (College Station: Texas A&M Press, 2007)
 

United States Navy in the 20th century
Military exercises involving the United States
Attack on Pearl Harbor
Naval exercises

United States Navy in the 21st century